Wang Kangping is a lieutenant general in the People's Liberation Army of China.

He is an alternate member of the 20th Central Committee of the Chinese Communist Party.

Biography
Wang was born in Heshan District of Yiyang, Hunan, and graduated from the PLA National Defence University.

Wang once served as commander of the 42nd Division of the PLA Air Force Aviation and deputy chief of staff of the Air Force of Chengdu Military Region.

In December 2017, he was promoted to become commander of the PLA Air Force Weapon Test Base, a position he held until June 2021, when he was commissioned as deputy commander of the Eastern Theater Command.

He was promoted to the rank of major general (shaojiang) in July 2014 and lieutenant general (zhongjiang) in June 2021.

References

Living people
People from Yiyang
PLA National Defence University alumni
People's Liberation Army generals from Hunan
People's Republic of China politicians from Hunan
Chinese Communist Party politicians from Hunan
Alternate members of the 20th Central Committee of the Chinese Communist Party
Year of birth missing (living people)